Cormac Battle (born 11 July 1972) is an Irish musician and radio presenter/producer. He is the vocalist and lead guitarist for the bands Kerbdog, Wilt, Jonny's Boys, and On the turn. He is also the current presenter of RTÉ 2fm's alternative music programme, The Battle Axe.

Early life
Battle was brought up in Kilkenny, Ireland, having moved from Bromley, UK at an early age.

Career

Music
In 1991 Battle, along with school friends Darragh Butler (drums), Colin Fennelly (bass) and Billy Dalton (guitar) came together to form a band called Rollercoaster before changing the name permanently to Kerbdog. Following two demo cassettes recorded in Dublin and a short support slot to Therapy? in 1992, the band was signed to Vertigo Records in London. The group released their self-titled album, produced by legendary grunge icon Jack Endino, in 1994. A second album entitled On The Turn was recorded in 1996, produced by GGGarth, but the album's release was delayed for almost a year indicating troublesome times for the band with their record company. Kerbdog were soon dropped and eventually split up in 1998.

Battle and Butler immediately formed another band, along with bassist Mick Murphy, called Wilt. Their music had a greater pop influence than Kerbdog. Following the release of two albums, Bastinado and My Medicine on Infectious Records, Wilt split up in 2003 following limited success.

At this point, Battle began to seriously focus on his DJ career and abandoned his musical pursuits. However, in 2005 Kerbdog reformed for a series of one-off shows. The band is still currently active on a part-time basis and have no plans to write or record new material.
His favourite Oxegen memory is playing the festival with Kerbdog in 2005.

Broadcasting
Battle began life at Phantom FM before moving, along with colleagues Jenny Huston and Dan Hegarty, in 2003 to RTE. Battle's late night show features new and alternative music from acts around the world as well as the 2fm sessions, live recordings, band interviews as well as from other sources. The Wireless is a supporter of the IMRO Showcase Tour. He also offered his voice to the narration of popular live music programme 2fm Live, which was broadcast on Saturday nights between 20:00 and 23:00 before it was axed and reformatted as 2fm XtrAlive. Battle regularly features in live coverage of high-profile musical events such as Electric Picnic and Oxegen, as well as being sent around the country to present the 2fm 2moro 2our. In 2008 Battle was sent to The Music Show to distribute advice. He has appeared on BBC Introducing to discuss the state of the Irish music industry. He also contributes to television programmes in Ireland.

References

External links
 Official RTÉ 2fm profile
 Unofficial Kerbdog Message Board

1972 births
Living people
Irish rock singers
Musicians from County Kilkenny
TXFM presenters
RTÉ 2fm presenters
21st-century Irish male singers